Éva Izsák (born 8 August 1967) is a road cyclist from Hungary. She represented her nation at the 1992 Summer Olympics in the women's road race.

References

External links
 profile at sports-reference.com

Hungarian female cyclists
Cyclists at the 1992 Summer Olympics
Olympic cyclists of Hungary
Living people
People from Mosonmagyaróvár
1967 births
Sportspeople from Győr-Moson-Sopron County